Calum Gahan (born 23 April 1997) is a Scotland international rugby league footballer who plays as a  for Toulouse Olympique in the Betfred Championship.

He previously played for the London Broncos in the Championship.

Background
Gahan was born in Darwin, Northern Territory, Australia. He is of Scottish descent.

He played his junior rugby league for the Litchfield Bears and represented the Northern Territories at youth level.

Gahan attended school in Queensland.

Playing career

Club career
He came through the youth system at the North Queensland Cowboys.

Gahan played for the Norths Devils in the Queensland Cup between 2018 and 2021.

London Broncos
He joined London at the start of the 2022 season.

Toulouse Olympique
On 3  November 2022 it was announced that he had joined Toulouse Olympique for the start of the 2023 season.

International career
In 2022 Gahan was named in the Scotland squad for the 2021 Rugby League World Cup.

In 2022 Gahan made his international début in for Scotland against the England Knights.

References

External links
London Broncos profile
Scotland RL profile
Scotland profile

1997 births
Living people
Australian rugby league players
Australian people of Scottish descent
London Broncos players
Norths Devils players
Rugby league hookers
Rugby league players from Darwin, Northern Territory
Scotland national rugby league team players
Toulouse Olympique players